"" ("This Day in Triumph God the Son") is a Lutheran hymn for Easter. Kaspar Stolzhagen published the hymn in 1592, and its setting by Bartholomäus Gesius (Zahn No. 2585) was published in 1601. The hymn was adopted in several hymnals, including the Evangelisches Gesangbuch. Composers such as Johann Sebastian Bach based compositions on its hymn tune.

History
Although hymnologists sometimes doubt his authorship, Stolzhagen (1550–1594) would have written "" in 1591. In 1592, Stolzhagen published the text as an Easter hymn ("song of the resurrection of Christ"). Gesius's setting of the hymn (Zahn No. 2585) appeared in two independent publications in 1601, indicating that its dissemination, and composition, dated from some time before it was printed.

Hymn
In its original publication, Stolzhagen's Easter hymn had sixteen stanzas of three lines. This version with three-line stanzas was possibly sung to the "Resurrexit Dominus" tune, Zahn No. 25a. In 1601, Gesius published a five-part setting (SSATB) of the hymn in the section about Easter of his Geistliche Deutsche Lieder (German spiritual songs). In his publication the hymn had six stanzas of six lines, derived from Stolzhagen's text. After Gesius, the hymn was mostly published in six-line stanzas. "Halleluja, Halleluja" is the text of every third line. In Gesius's setting, the melody rises on every first mentioning of Halleluja.

Musical settings
From the 17th to the 19th century, the hymn was included in dozens of hymnals. Johann Hermann Schein published a six-part setting with seven stanzas, based on Gesius's hymn tune, in his 1627 , a setting which was republished by Gottfried Vopelius in 1682. Cantatas based on the hymn were written by Dieterich Buxtehude (BuxWV 43, setting the text of the first stanza) and Christoph Graupner (GWV 1129/15). Bach wrote a chorale prelude BWV 630 as part of the Easter section of his Orgelbüchlein; and a four-part chorale (BWV 342,  based on the hymn tune. The hymn was adopted as No. 109 in the German Protestant hymnal Evangelisches Gesangbuch, in

References

Sources

External links
 
 GVL 6045 "Heut triumphieret Gottes Sohn" (Osterlied, Halleluja) Volksmusikarchiv des Bezirks Oberbayern
 BWV 630: audio at James Kibbie's Bach Organ Works website

Lutheran hymns
16th-century hymns in German
Easter hymns